James Crane may refer to:
 James Crane (actor) (1889–1968), American stage and screen actor
 James Crane (police officer) (1921–1994), British police officer
 James L. Crane, American football coach
 Jim Crane (born 1954), American businessman and baseball team owner

See also
 Jimmie Crane, American songwriter